The August Macke Prize, named after the painter August Macke, was given the first time in 1959 by the districts Arnsberg, Brilon, Meschede and Olpe in the region of the Hochsauerland, Germany.

With the award the recipients get the offer to show their works in museum show in Arnsberg and get a monetary prize of 20,000 €.

Recipients 
1959: Carl Josef Hoffmann, Gebhard Schwermer
1964: Christa Biederbick
1969: Christine Bandau, Ruth Hoffmann and Claus Harnischmacher
1975: Bernd Bohmeier, Theo Lambertin
1978: Emil Schumacher
1981: Monika Hollekamp
1984: Günter Ferdinand Ris
1987: Gotthard Graubner
1990: Fujio Akai
1993: Herbert Bardenheuer
1996: Heribert Friedland
2000: Ansgar Nierhoff
2005: Matthias Weischer
2008: Leiko Ikemura
2011: Corinne Wasmuht
2014: Kerstin Brätsch
2017: Michael Sailstorfer

See also
 List of European art awards

References
 

German art awards
Awards established in 1959
Contemporary art awards
August Macke